Legia Warszawa Sekcja Koszykówki (in English: Legia Warsaw Basketball Section) is a Polish men's basketball club, based in Warsaw. The team currently plays in the PLK, the Polish first division. The club was established in 1929 as the basketball section of the military multi-sport club of Legia Warsaw. Legia became the leading team in Polish basketball in the 1950s and 1960s with seven national championships and two national cups.

History
The basketball section of Legia Warsaw was founded in 1929. The first game of the team was on December 8, 1929, when the team won 31–5 over Jutrznia. 

The team was re-activated in 1947, after absence during World War II, by students from the Stefana Batorego. The team won the national high school championship, and after several more promotions, it returned to the highest-level league in 1951. 

Legia played its first international match on September 6, 1953, facing UDA Praha. In 1956, the first national championship in club history was won after finishing first with a 14–4 record.

On May 15, 2014, the team was brought under a new legal form when the joint-stock company "Legia Warszawa Sekcja Koszykówki" was founded; the main shareholders of the club are Legia Warszawa SA and Robert Chabelski. In 2017, Legia was promoted to the PLK after being absent for 14 years.

Players

Current roster

Depth chart

Honours
Total titles: 9

Domestic competitions
Polish Championship:
Winners (7): 1956, 1957, 1960, 1961, 1963, 1966, 1969
 Runners-up (1): 2022
Polish Cup:
Winners (2): 1968, 1970
I Liga
Winners (1): 2017

Season by season

 Cancelled due to the COVID-19 pandemic in Europe.

International record

Notable players

Notable players

 Cezary Trybański

References

External links
Official website

Legia Warsaw
Basketball teams in Poland
Military sports clubs
1929 establishments in Poland